Ondřej Mihálik (born 2 April 1997) is a professional Czech football striker who plays for Slovácko.

Career
Mihálik made his career league debut for Jablonec on 13 September 2014 in a 4–1 away win at 1. FK Příbram.

He made a winter move away from FK Jablonec in January 2018 to AZ Alkmaar signing with the club until 2022 on a 4.5-year deal.

He was loaned to Viktoria Plzeň on a season-long loan with an option to purchase, in July 2019. In June 2020 Míhálik signed a contract with Viktoria Plzeň on a three-year deal.

Personal life
On 27 February 2020 his child Tádo was born.

References

External links
 
 Ondřej Mihálik official international statistics
 

Living people
1997 births
Association football forwards
Czech footballers
Czech Republic under-21 international footballers
Czech Republic youth international footballers
Czech First League players
Czech National Football League players
Eredivisie players
FK Jablonec players
AZ Alkmaar players
Jong AZ players
FC Viktoria Plzeň players
FC Sellier & Bellot Vlašim players
Czech expatriate footballers
Expatriate footballers in the Netherlands
Czech expatriate sportspeople in the Netherlands
Sportspeople from Jablonec nad Nisou
SK Dynamo České Budějovice players
1. FC Slovácko players